The Welsh Cricket Association (WCA) (founded 1969) is the governing body of Welsh amateur cricket. It also runs the Welsh Cup and convenes the Welsh Coaching Forum. The WCA aims to promote, encourage, and improve amateur cricket in Wales, and to encourage and develop active participation in the game. Over 270 counties, associations, leagues and clubs are affiliated to the WCA.

The Welsh Cricket Association is based at the SWALEC Stadium, Sophia Gardens, Cardiff.

See also
Cricket Wales
Cricket in Wales

References

Sports governing bodies in Wales
Wales
Cricket administration in Wales
Organisations based in Cardiff
1969 establishments in Wales